Marko Vejinović (born 3 February 1990) is a Dutch professional footballer who plays as a central midfielder for Eerste Divisie club Heracles Almelo. Having started his professional career with AZ, with whom he won the Dutch Championship, he went on to play for Heracles Almelo, Vitesse, Feyenoord, AZ, Arka Gdynia, ADO Den Haag and Tianjin Jinmen Tiger.

Club career

Early years
Vejinović  started playing football at the age of seven at a small Dutch club by the name of Zeeburgia. Ajax scouts immediately recognized his talent, where he consequently spent the next seven years playing for the youth team at Ajax. He continued his career later at FC Utrecht and then at AZ Alkmaar.

Vejinović made his debut in the Eredivisie with AZ on 22 March 2009, in a 0–0 draw at home against Feyenoord. AZ won the league championship that season.

After he refused to extend his contract, he left Heracles Almelo as a free agent in summer 2013.

Vejinović returned to Heracles on 4 July 2022, signing a two-year contract with an option for an additional year.

International career
Of Bosnian-Serbian descent, Vejinović is eligible to play for the Netherlands, Bosnia and Herzegovina, and Serbia.

On 2 November 2015, he was called up to the provisional senior Netherlands squad for friendlies against Wales and Germany. The following day he stated he was unsure whether he would accept the invitation. On 9 November 2015, having chosen to accept the invitation, he said he never doubted his choice.

Personal life
Vejinović is a Dutch citizen of Bosnian Serb descent. In 2015, he married a Dutch woman named Sophie.

Honours
AZ
 Eredivisie: 2008–09

Feyenoord
 Eredivisie: 2016–17
 KNVB Cup: 2015–16

References

External links
 
 Marko Vejinovic at Voetbal International  – 
 Marko Vejinovic at OnsOranje  – 

1990 births
Living people
Footballers from Amsterdam
Association football midfielders
Dutch footballers
Eredivisie players
Ekstraklasa players
Chinese Super League players
AZ Alkmaar players
Heracles Almelo players
SBV Vitesse players
Feyenoord players
A.V.V. Zeeburgia players
Arka Gdynia players
Tianjin Jinmen Tiger F.C. players
Dutch people of Serbian descent
Dutch people of Bosnia and Herzegovina descent
Netherlands youth international footballers
Netherlands under-21 international footballers
Dutch expatriate footballers
Expatriate footballers in Poland
Dutch expatriate sportspeople in Poland
Expatriate footballers in China
Dutch expatriate sportspeople in China